The Red Army of Turin was a Socialist paramilitary organisation set up in September 1919. Their role was to offer military defence to socialist organisations and meetings. One of their first engagements was on 24 September 1919 when they returned gunfire after police and soldiers opened fire on a banned  open air demonstration organised by the Socialist Party of Turin against the seizure of Fiume by Italian nationalists led by Gabriele d'Annunzio.

References

1919 establishments in Italy
20th century in Turin
Left-wing militant groups in Italy
Military units and formations established in 1919
Socialism in Italy